Craig Mitchell Park (born 1 March 1986) is a South African former first-class cricketer.

Park was born in South Africa at Empangeni, where he was educated at Grantleigh School. After completing his education at Grantleigh, he travelled to England to attend Anglia Ruskin University in Cambridge. While studying at Anglia Ruskin, Park made his debut in first-class cricket for Cambridge MCCU against Surrey at Fenner's in 2010. He played first-class cricket for Cambridge MCCU until 2012, making eight appearances. Park scored a total of 360 runs at an average of 36.00 across his eight matches, with a high score of 81. With his right-arm fast-medium bowling, Park took 2 wickets from 64 overs bowled.

In 2011, Park was called up to the Unicorns squad for the Clydesdale Bank 40, making his List A one-day debut in the tournament against Glamorgan at Cardiff. He made six further List A appearance for the Unicorns during the tournament. He scored 72 runs across his seven one-day matches, with a high score of 38. He also made his debut in minor counties cricket for Cambridgeshire in 2011, making four appearances in the MCCA Knockout Trophy between 2011–2016, alongside four appearances in the minor counties 20-over competition in 2015.

He is currently employed by the Marylebone Cricket Club as a youth cricket administrator. His brothers, Garry and Sean have also played cricket at first-class and List A level.

Notes and references

External links

1986 births
Living people
People from Empangeni
South African expatriate sportspeople in England
Alumni of Anglia Ruskin University
South African cricketers
Cambridge MCCU cricketers
Cambridgeshire cricketers
Unicorns cricketers
Cricketers from KwaZulu-Natal